Plymouth North High School, formerly known as Plymouth-Carver Regional High School, and known informally as Plymouth North or PNHS, is a public high school located in Plymouth, Massachusetts, United States. Its students are residents of the town of Plymouth. The school is one of two high schools in Plymouth, the other being Plymouth South High School. Plymouth North is located south of Plymouth Center, and is located adjacent to the Plymouth County Courthouse, the Plymouth County Registry of Deeds, and Beth Israel Deaconess Hospital. The school colors are Blue, White & Silver and the school mascot is an Eagle. Plymouth North opened under the name Plymouth High School, but changed its name to Plymouth-Carver Regional High School when Carver joined the district in 1963. With the opening of Carver High School in 1987, it was renamed Plymouth North High School. It serves over 1300 students in grades 9-12 from the North, West, and Central neighborhoods of Plymouth. Plymouth North features a full range of academic courses as well as state-of-the-art vocational technical programs in Marketing, Allied Health, Engineering, and Facilities Management. Plymouth North High School is accredited by the New England Association of Schools and Colleges. In June 2021, Plymouth North High School was placed (along with the entire Plymouth Public Schools district) into a state program for schools or districts that disproportionately suspend nonwhite students or students with disabilities.

Awards

On April 27, 2007, Plymouth North High School was presented with an environmental award at the Massachusetts State House. The Commonwealth of Massachusetts Executive Office of Energy and Environmental Affairs presented the award at their 13th Annual Awards for Excellence in Environmental Education in recognition of Plymouth North's Life Skills program and its recycling efforts.

 Girls Indoor Track State Champions – 2016
 Football State Champions – 1984, 1989
 Football State Finalists – 1975, 1993
 In 2011 the Plymouth North Eagles won their 2nd state title in 4 years with a 3–1 win over Hudson
 In 2014 the Plymouth North Boys Tennis Team won their second consecutive A.C.L Title, they also made it to the Semis of States.
 In the 2013–2014 season, Plymouth North Dance Team placed first at the competition for the first time in history. They took home first place and grand champions overall at a UDA competition including teams from high schools and colleges around Massachusetts.

References

External links
School's official site

Buildings and structures in Plymouth, Massachusetts
North High School
Educational institutions established in 1963
Schools in Plymouth County, Massachusetts
Public high schools in Massachusetts
1963 establishments in Massachusetts